Cedar Lake may refer to:

Lakes

Canada 
 Cedar Lake (Manitoba)
 Cedar Lake (Ontario)

United States 

Cedar Lake, Alabama, community established outside Decatur for African Americans
 Cedar Lake (California)
 Cedar Lake (Illinois)
 Cedar Lake (Maine)
 Cedar Lake (Aitkin County, Minnesota)
 Cedar Lake (Martin County, Minnesota)
 Cedar Lake (McLeod and Meeker counties, Minnesota)
 Cedar Lake (Minneapolis), Minnesota
 Cedar Lake (Scott County, Minnesota)
 Cedar Lake (Morris County, New Jersey)
 Cedar Lake (New York)
 Cedar Lake (Le Flore County, Oklahoma)
 Cedar Lake, former name of Chester Morse Lake in Washington
 Cedar Lake (St. Croix County, Wisconsin)

Places

United States 
 Cedar Lake, Indiana
 Cedar Lake Township, Scott County, Minnesota
 Cedar Lake, Minnesota
 Cedar Lake, New Jersey
 Cedar Lake, Oklahoma
 Cedar Lake, Texas
 Cedar Lake, Wisconsin
 Cedar Lake (community), Wisconsin

See also 
 Cedar Lakes, several small water bodies in Ontario, Canada

 Big Cedar Lake, Wisconsin, United States
 Cedar Lake Trail, a path in Minneapolis, Minnesota, United States
 Cedar Lake Contemporary Ballet, New York City, New York, United States
 Cedar Lake Speedway, a track in Wisconsin, United States
 Cedar Pond (disambiguation)
 Little Cedar Lake, a water body in Quebec, Canada
 Little Cedar Lake (Wisconsin)